Anugerah Juara Lagu (literally: "Song Championship Award"), commonly known by the acronym AJL, is a popular annual music competition in Malaysia, organised by TV3 since 1986. It features the best musical and lyrical compositions of each year it is held. Nominees are derived from a list of mostly Malay-language songs which have garnered the most public votes in Muzik Muzik throughout the year, and then progress into the semifinals, from which twelve songs will be nominated by a panel of judges to become the winner of Juara Lagu.

AJL honours the composers and lyricists of the songs rather than the performing artistes.

History and background
Originally, Juara Lagu was introduced as a show that had a simple publication format that was easy to understand and follow for the audience. Anugerah Juara Lagu began in 1986 and has captivated many audiences over the years. Datuk Ahmad Merican who was then the Program Manager of TV3 was the pioneer of the Muzik Muzik show which started airing on Sunday, 2 March 1986 at 8.30 pm. From the songs nominated in the Musics that will be taken and screened to the next level.

In the early years of the Juara Lagu, final contestants were screened from the monthly champions. In the early stages of the organization, the public also made nominations and elections through local daily newspapers. Until 1991, each monthly champion was eligible to be screened for the finals. Beginning in 1992, the Juara Lagu format was changed by introducing categories with the aim of encouraging participation from genres such as traditional rhythms and ballads as rock genres were much dominant at that time.

Regular changes have been made to the format of the plan to the weekly chart system. Chart 20 is introduced as used by Music Music now. This chart format gives the opportunity for new songs to enter the chart on a weekly basis. The songs that are successfully screened will be taken to the semi-finals to select 12 songs that will be competed to the finals to be crowned as the "Juara Lagu".

In 2009, competitions by category were abolished due to a critical lack of entries from traditional rhythmic songs and creative ethnicities.

Anugerah Juara Lagu are held either at the end of the year or at the beginning of the following year. The location of AJL, which is a venue for artists and composers to compete for talent, was once held at the San Choo Hall at Wisma MCA, Angkasapuri RTM Auditorium , Sri Pentas Dua, Shah Alam City Hall, Merdeka Hall, PWTC , Malawati Stadium Shah Alam, Axiata Arena and Putra Stadium Bukit Jalil .

Juara Lagu has also invited local and international professional judges, especially from the Malay region such as Singapore , Indonesia, the Philippines and Japan to judge the finals. The evaluation focuses on the melodies, lyrics and performances of the artist.

 1986 - "First Juara Lagu organized"
 1988 - "Juara Lagu aired in several Asian countries through television collaborations (Japan, Indonesia and the Philippines)
 1992 - "Genre category segregation system introduced without Best Performance award. Open category abolished"
 1993 - "Rebranding of categories from Creative Pop to Ballad, Rock to Pop Rock; while re -composing classic song entries are abolished"
 1994 - "First time Juara lagu held without musicians; invited jury"
 1995 - "Public jury involvement from 4 locations across the country"
 1996 - "Modern version of the Song Champion Trophy introduced; used to this day. Accompanying musicians featured again"
 1997 - "A modern version of the Juara Lagu logo is introduced, used to this day"
 1998 - "Song Champions are held without musicians, without major sponsors and broadcast from studios due to the economic downturn"
 1999 - "Music montage Muzik Muzik/Juara Lagu introduced all; AJL's first collaboration with music director Ramli MS"
 2000 - "AJL begins broadcasting via digital (streaming) and radio platforms"
 2001 - "Short message system (SMS) voting system is introduced for public judging of 70%. Song Champions are held without musicians"
 2002 - "Juara Lagu branded as Anugerah Juara Lagu"
 2004 - "Song Champion Award begins airing from Putra Stadium (Axiata Arena)"
 2007 - "Entry quota by category modified to include more songs from popular genres"
 2008 - "The first entry of the song by Wildcard -" Dingin "(Azlan Abu Hassan)"
 2009 - "Open category reintroduced after genre segregation was abolished"
 2011 - "Anugerah Juara Lagu creates the highest live viewing record in the history of television entertainment broadcasts at 6.5 million viewers"
 2016 - "Online voting introduced for public judging, replacing short messaging system (SMS)"
 2019 - "Two participant performances are banned from digital screenings after live appearances featured unauthorized elements"
 2020 - "Anugerah Juara Lagu took place during the Movement and Emergency Control Order 2021; held for the first time without audiences in the event hall. A certificate of commitment of participants to follow standardized performance conditions was introduced"

Organizing List

Judging 
The competition started from the weekly popular voting stage in the Muzik Muzik program where voting was made by the audience through newspaper forms (1986-2002) and online voting (2003-present). The accumulated scores will determine the 30 songs that will compete in the Semi Final commemorations. At this stage the songs that will advance to the finals will be judged by a professional jury appointed from the composer and music director.

Anugerah Juara Lagu uses a professional judging method where a group of music artists from various backgrounds are gathered to evaluate the quality of the song that advanced to the finals to be crowned the champion song, runner-up, third place and category champion (1992-2008). On awards night, the scoring of the vocal performance and the stage performance will be combined to determine the championship. Vocal scoring is 100% in the hands of the jury, while the stage performance is determined either through fan votes (press, telephone, SMS, online) or combined/determined by a professional jury.

List of Overall Winners of the Song Champion Award 
* For a full list of entries, please see Songs That Have Competed in the Song Champion Awards

Hint :

Title = Song title

Composition = Creator/Composer

Lyrics = Lyricist

Artist = Singer

Album = Album that published the song

Beginning in 1993, the Music Industry Awards (MIA) adding category in the best song award, and the following are the results comparison markers;

† = Song that won AIM Best Song

† S = Song that wins any AIM Best Category Song

‡ = Song nominated as Best Song / any AIM best category song

‡ S = Song nominated in any AIM best category song

If measured through competition through albums, the following are the markers;

† C = Album that wins any AIM Best Category Album

† K = Album that won AIM's Overall Best Album

‡ C = Album nominated in any AIM best category album

‡ K = Album nominated for AIM Overall Best Album

Runner-up & Third Place 

 List of Runners-up of the Song Champion Award
 List of Third Place Winners of the Song Champion Award

Category Champions 
When first organized in 1986, AJL competed in open categories for all song genres. However, from the 7th AJL (1992) to the 23rd AJL (2008), the organizers opened three categories arranged according to song genre. The categories are ballads, pop rock and creative ethnic Malaysian rhythms. The opening of this category, among others, to ensure that the traditional music genre also competes with today's pop songs. Competitions by category were abolished in 2009 due to a lack of entries from traditional rhythmic songs.

 Ballad Category Song Champion
 Pop Rock Category Song Champion
 Creative Ethnic Category Song Winner

Special Category

Best Performance

Best Lyrics 

 1986 : Sekadar di Pinggiran (Lukhman S.)
 1987 : Menaruh Harapan (Habsah Hassan)
 1988 : Cukuplah Sekali (Habsah Hassan)
 1989 : Isabella (Bob Lokman)
 1990 : Suci Dalam Debu ( S. Amin Shahab )
 1991 : Tiara (M. Nasir)
 1992 : Pada Syurga Di Wajahmu (Bob Lokman)

Beginning in 1993, this category was not contested separately but counted in the creation of a song.

Best Vocals 
This category was first competed in 2002 at the 17th Anugerah Juara Lagu

Other Awards 

 1995 : Most Entry Award (Singer): Rohana Jalil
 1995 : Most Entry Award (Composer): M. Nasir
 2009 : Popular Singer Award: Stacy - "Pakai Buang"
 2009 : Most Downloaded Songs (Hotlink): Akim - "Bengang"
 2011 : Celcom Mobile Champion Award: Anuar Zain - "Sedetik Lebih"
 2012 : Celcom Mobile Champion Award: Hafiz Suip and Adira Suhaimi - "Ombak Rindu"
 2013 : Celcom Mobile Champion Award: Hafiz Suip - "Bahagiamu Deritaku"
 2015 : AJL Qu Diva Award: Siti Nurhaliza - "Cindai"
 2017 : Samsung Singer of the Year Award: Khai Bahar - "Bayang"
 2019 : Fan Choice Award Set: Haqiem Rusli - "Lembah Kesepian"

Trivia

Double wins and entries 

 If according to the open competition format, only Francissca Peter and Manan Ngah have ever won two main places in one ceremony, namely the Champion and Runner -up in the first AJL (1986). Ezra Kong managed to repeat the success of Manan Ngah when he won two main places in one ceremony, namely Champion with Loca B & Noki and Third Place with Hael Husaini in AJL 35 (2020) as composer and lyricist. Meanwhile, according to the category competition format, M. Nasir has twice won two of the three genre categories respectively in 1994 (Pop Rock & Malaysian Rhythm) and 1997 (Malaysian Rhythm & as lyricist for the Pop Rock category) as well as singer Siti Nurhaliza also twice in 1999 and 2000 (Malaysian Rhythm & Ballad).

 The only similar result for the Anugerah Juara Lagu and Music Industry Award for the overall Best Song category was through the song " Jerat Percintaan" sung by Siti Nurhaliza (Dato ') in 1996. While the song " Awan Nano " sung by Hafiz was the only one winner of Song Champion and also Best Song of the Anugerah Planet Muzik (APM) in 2013.

 The “Gila” victory made Kaka Azraff, Noki and Loca B the first trio singers to win the AJL.

 M. Nasir became the first composer to win the AJL four times with three songs sung by himself, namely through the song "Tanya Sama Itu Hud Hud" (1994), "Ghazal Untuk Rabiah" (1997), "Andalusia" (1999) and other singer's songs namely “Awan Nano” (2011) sung by Hafiz.

 Four artists have won the Juara Lagu as composer, lyricist and singer, namely M. Nasir for the song "Tanya Sama Itu Hud Hud" in 1994 , Yasin for the song "Mimpi Laila" in 2001 , Ana Raffali for the song "Tolong Ingatkan Aku" in 2010 and Yuna with the song "Terukir di Bintang" in 2012 . However, Yuna only sang the song herself in the semi-finals of Juara Lagu while during the final of AJL 27, Aizat Amdan replaced her because Yuna was tied to the album recording commitment in the United States.

 Ana Raffali was the first female composer to win a major award in 2010 (Tolong Ingatkan Aku), while Habsah Hassan was the first female lyricist to win the award in 1987 (Menaruh Harapan).

 Misha Omar was the first singer to win a major award for her debut song. The song Bunga-bunga Cinta which was recorded in 2002 was Misha's first recorded song and won the AJL in 2003. While the song Jerat Percintaan sung by Siti Nurhaliza was not the first song that he recorded even though it was taken from the singer's debut album.
 Hael Husaini is the first singer to win major awards for two consecutive editions through Jampi (AJL32) and Haram (with Dayang Nurfaizah) (AJL33). The win also made him and Ezra Kong the first composer and lyricist to top the AJL major award for two consecutive years.

 Until 2008 when the following year, the category participation was dissolved, only Siti Nurhaliza and Dayang Nurfaizah had participated in AJL in all categories. Siti participated in all alternate categories since 1998 while Dayang participated in the Pop Rock category in 2001 besides winning the Ballad category that year. In 2004, Dayang won the Creative Ethnic category.

 If we take into account the participation for the open category, only Dayang Nurfaizah is the singer who participated in all categories, namely 3 categories according to genre in the category format and participated in the AJL during the open format.

 Noh Salleh is the only singer who joined AJL in 4 out of 5 solo performance formats ("Angin Kencang"), in a voice/duo ("In Love With You" - Aizat Amdan), with the band ("Aku Skandal" & "Mencari Konklusi" - Hujan Band), in a group voice ("Pelita" - Monoloque & Azlan Rosle (API)). Noh just hasn't tried singing collaboratively with appearances ( featuring ).

 Dato 'Sri Siti Nurhaliza is the only singer to have won all three categories in different years, getting the best performance in all categories for the song "Jerat Percintaan" (1996), "Aku Cinta Padamu" (1997), "Ya Maulai " (2001)," Nirmala "(2002),"Ku Milikmu" (2003) and won the overall Juara Lagu for the ballad and Malaysian rhythm category but not for pop rock. She is also the most frequently qualified artist to AJL (after Rohana Jalil) from 1996 to 2003 and even Siti Nurhaliza topped the record by qualifying for AJL for 8 consecutive years. The number of songs sung by Siti Nurhaliza is also the most eligible for AJL with 18 songs for 9 years (1996 to 2003, and 2007).
 23 of her songs made it to the semi-finals
 18 of her songs made it to the finals
 17 trophies she has won
 5 Best Performance Trophies
 9 Category Champion Trophies (4 ballads, 4 Malaysian/creative ethnic rhythms, 1 pop rock)
 3 Song Champion Trophy
 8 years in a row participated in the finals
 7 consecutive years of ballad song participation to the finals. (1996-2002)
 5 consecutive years of participation in creative Malaysian/ethnic rhythm songs to the finals. (1998-2002)
 4 consecutive years of participation of 3 songs to the finals. (1998-2001)
 5 years not in a row pop rock song participation to the finals. (1998-1999, 2001, 2003, 2007)

 The only category that Siti Nurhaliza has never won is Best Vocal since the competition in 2002.

 For the open format, Hafiz Suip is the only singer who has won all the places in different years. He has won Song Champion (Awan Nano - AJL26 & Bahagiamu Deritaku - AJL28), Runner-up (Terimaku Seadanya - AJL31) with Misha Omar , Third Place (Noktah Cinta - AJL25 & Ku Akui - AJL27), Best Vocal (AJL25 , AJL26 , AJL27 & AJL34) and Best Performance (AJL28 & AJL34).

 Misha Omar, Jaclyn Victor, Hafiz Suip and Dayang Nurfaizah were the participants who won the Best Vocal award more than once. Misha Omar through his participation in 2003, 2004 and 2018, Jaclyn Victor in 2007 (duet with Lah Ahmad) and 2013. Hafiz won it in 2010, 2011, 2012 and 2019, making him the most winning singer in the category. Dayang Nurfaizah won it in 2014, 2015 and 2016.

 Among the artists who won big for a song including the overall winner in the Anugerah Juara Lagu are:
 1988 - Ramlah Ram (Best Song & Performance Winner): "Kau Kunci Cintamu Dalam Hatiku"
 1989 - Search Band (Winner of Best Song & Performance): "Isabella"
 1993 - Fauziah Latiff (Song Champion including Category & Best Performance Champion): "Teratai Layu di Tasik Madu"
 1994 - M. Nasir (Song Champion including Category Champion & Best Performance): "Tanya Sama Itu Hud -Hud" & Creative Ethnic Category Champion "Bonda"
 1995 - Aishah (Song Champion including Category & Best Performance Champion): "Cinta Beralih Arah"
 1996 - Siti Nurhaliza (Song Champion including Category & Best Performance Champion): "Jerat Percintaan"
 2000 - Siti Nurhaliza (Song Champion including Category Champion): "Balqis" & Ballad Category Champion "Kau Kekasihku
 2003 - Misha Omar (Song Winner including Best Vocal & Category Winner): "Bunga-Bunga Cinta"
 2006 - Adibah Noor (Song Winner including Best Vocal & Category Winner): "Terlalu Istimewa"
 2009 - Aizat Amdan (Song Champion for the song "Pergi") & (Best Performance: "Kau Aku")
 2011 - Hafiz Suip (Best Song & Vocal Winner): "Awan Nano"
 2013 - Hafiz Suip (Song Champion, Best Performance & Mobile Champion): "Bahagiamu Deritaku"
 2015 - Akim & The Majistret (Winner of Best Song & Performance): "Potret"
 2016 - Dayang Nurfaizah (Best Song & Vocal Winner): "Lelaki Teragung"

 Artists who did NOT win Juara Lagu BUT won 2 or more awards at one Anugerah Juara Lagu:
 1997 - Siti Nurhaliza (Winner of Best Ballad & Performance Category): "Aku Cinta Padamu"
 1999 - Noraniza Idris - Best Performance & Winner of the Creative Ethnic Category "Hati Kama"
 1999 - Siti Nurhaliza - "Purnama Merindu" Ballad Category Winner & "Hati Kama" Creative Ethnic Category Winner
 2001 - Siti Nurhaliza (Pop Rock Category Champion): "Engkau Bagaikan Permata" & Best Performance: "Ya Maulai"
 2002 - Siti Nurhaliza (Winner of Creative Ethnic Category & Best Performance): "Nirmala"
 2004 - Misha Omar - Best Vocal & "Pulangkan" Ballad Category Winner
 2005 - Hazami - Best Vocal & "Kata" Pop Rock Category Winner
 2005 - Mawi - Best Performance & Winner of Creative Ethnic Category "Aduh Saliha"
 2008 - Faizal Tahir - Best Vocal, Best Performance & "Sampai Syurga" Ballad Category Winner
 2010 - Hafiz Suip - Third Place for the song "Noktah Cinta" & Best Vocal through the same song "Noktah Cinta"
 2012 - Hafiz Suip - Third Place for the song "Ku Akui" & Best Vocal through the same song "Ku Akui"
 2014 - Dayang Nurfaizah - Third Place & Best Vocal through the same song "Di Pintu Syurga"
 2018 - Misha Omar - Third Place & Best Vocal through the same song "Sampai Bila"
 2019 - Hafiz Suip - Best Vocal & Best Performance "Kisah Cinta Kita"

 Among the artists who have qualified for the finals of the Song Champion Award with 2 songs in one category solo are:
 2000 Anugerah Juara Lagu :
 Siti Nurhaliza - Ballad Category - "Kau Kekasihku" & "Nian di Hati"
 Noraniza Idris - Malaysian Rhythm/Creative Ethnic Category - "Tinting" & "Ngajat Tampi"
 Amy Mastura - Pop Rock Category - "Bintang Hati" & "Sha Na Na"
 2005 Anugerah Juara Lagu:
 Jaclyn Victor - Ballad Category - "Glorious" & "Face"
 2007 Anugerah Juara Lagu:
 Faizal Tahir - Ballad Category - "Kasih Tercipta" & "Mahakarya Cinta"
 2008 Anugerah Juara Lagu:
 Faizal Tahir - Ballad Category - "Sampai Syurga" & "Cuba"
 2009 Anugerah Juara Lagu:
 Aizat - "Pergi" & "Kau Aku"
 2010 Anugerah Juara Lagu:
 Faizal Tahir - "Hanyut" & "Selamat Malam"
 2011 Anugerah Juara Lagu:
 Yuna - "Gadis Semasa" & "Penakut"

 Exist and Bunkface are the most frequent music bands to the finals of the Juara Lagu with 4 entries:
 Exist Band:
 1992 Anugerah Juara Lagu - "Untukmu Ibu" with vocalist Mamat
 1994 Anugerah Juara Lagu - "Anugerah" with vocalist Mamat.
 2002 Anugerah Juara Lagu - "Julia" with vocalist Ezad.
 2003 Anugerah Juara Lagu - "Percayakan Siti" with vocalist Ezad. 

 Bunkface Band:
 2009 Anugerah Juara Lagu - "Situasi"
 2010 Anugerah Juara Lagu - "Extravaganza"
 2014 Anugerah Juara Lagu - "Rentak Laguku"
 2015 Anugerah Juara Lagu - "Malam Ini Kita Punya"

 Kool is also a music band that advanced to the final round of Song Champion 4 times in a row with their participation for the first time at the Anugerah Juara Lagu 1995 through the song "Kau dan Aku" (replacing Ning Baizura) and also became the champion in the Pop Rock category. At the 1996 Anugerah Juara Lagu, Kool Band once again reached the finals of Juara Lagu with an Independent song and this song also won the Pop Rock category making Kool Band one of the first music groups to win the category 2 times in a row.

 Among the songs sung by the Kool Group in Juara Lagu are:
 1995 Anugerah Juara Lagu - Kau Dan Aku (replacing Ning Baizura)
 1996 Anugerah Juara Lagu - Bebas
 1997 Anugerah Juara Lagu - Cemburu
 1998 Anugerah Juara Lagu - Satu Arah

 All of these songs were nominated in the Pop Rock category, where the song "Kau Dan Aku" and "Bebas" was the category champion.

 Renowned lyricist, Habsah Hassan is the most nominated lyricist in the history of AJL. She won the best lyrics category twice with the songs "Menaruh Harapan" (1987) and "Cukuplah Sekali" (1988).

Entry more than three times but failed 

 With a total of 7 entries, Stacy is the most frequent singer to the final stage without any wins.
 Nora Ariffin has participated in the Anugerah Juara Lagu five times without a win, before winning it for the first time at the 2007 Anugerah Juara Lagu, through the song "Samudera". However, Nora has competed with six different songs, including two in 2001.
 Artists who have participated in the Juara Lagu three times without winning any awards:
 Stacy - 7 times (2008, 2009, 2010, 2012, 2013, 2014, 2015)
 Hazama Azmi - 7 times (4 times with The Penglipurlara: 2013, 2016, 2017 and 2019; once with Amy Search in 2012), 2014 and 2015 as a solo singer
 Noh Salleh (Hujan) - 5 times (2 times with Hujan: 2009, 2010, once with API and Aizat Amdan respectively in 2010 and 2013) and 2015 as a solo singer
 Exist Band - 4 times (1992, 1994, 2002, 2003)
 Bunkface - 4 times (2009, 2010, 2014, 2015)
 Erra Fazira - 3 times (1999, 2000, 2004)
 Anuar Zain - 3 times (1998, 2003, 2004)
 Shura - 3 times (2002, 2004, 2006)
 Zamani Ibrahim - 3 times (once with Slam Band (1996), 2002 and 2004 as a solo singer)
 Man Bai - 3 times (2 times with Gersang Band: 1988, 1989 and 1996 as a solo singer)
 Mus (MAY) - 3 times (2 times with the MAY Band: 1989, 2003 and 1997 as a singer of the Wings Band)
 Hattan - 3 times (1991, 1992, 2014)

Non-Malay and foreign participation 

 Non-bumiputera singers who have made it to the AJL finals are Alleycats (1986, 1987), Ben Nathan (1988) and Jaclyn Victor (2005, 2007, 2011) (Indian) as well as Vince (2004) (Chinese English), Casey (1995) (Chinese & Indian) and Elizabeth Tan (2015).

 Singers of bumiptera descent other than the Malay tribe who have participated in this competition are Rich (2007, 2008), Stacy (2008 - 2010, 2012 - 2013 and 2014), Jimmy Palikat (2012) (Kadazan-Dusun) and Lina Kamsan (1993) (Javanese). Only Francissca Peter (1986 - 1988) of Serani descent was the AJL champion in 1986.

 Aubrey Suwito became the first non-Bumiputera composer to win the AJL main award in 2005 for his song "Gemilang", he is Indonesian Peranakan Chinese descent. Meanwhile, Pete Teo through the song "Pergi" in 2009 became the first composer of Chinese descent to win the AJL.

 Endang Es Taurina and Rio Febrian, are two Indonesian singers who have competed in the finals of the Juara Lagu. Endang through the song "Sangkar Emas" created by A. Ali and Lukhman S. in 1990 while Rio did not perform (represented by Lah Ahmad) when selected through the song "Ceritera Cinta" in 2007. While Glenn Fredly had advanced to the semi-finals the end of the Ballad in 2000 through the song "Dengarkanlah" (duet with Amy Mastura) created by Helen Yap, but lost.

 Adi Priyo, vocalist and composer for the group 6ixth Sense, had competed in the semi-finals with 4 songs, but failed to advance to all of them. The songs are "Tanpa" (AJL 23), "Khatimah Cinta" (AJL 25), "Menyesal" and "Cinta Matiku" (AJL 26). However, through his participation as a composer, Adi's song titled "Kisah Hati" sung by Alyah made it to the 26th AJL (also won the Best Performance award).

 M. Nasir started competing in the Anugerah Juara Lagu in 1990 with the song "Mustika". Prior to that, many of M. Nasir's songs sung in groups or solo could not compete due to his Singapore citizenship status . Some of his works with Malaysian artists such as Rahim Maarof , Kumpulan Search and Nasir Jani could not be competed even though they were quite popular at the time.

 The song "Puteri Ledang" sung by Lina Kamsan in 1993 was sung entirely in Javanese. While the song "Andalusia" by M. Nasir in 1999, "Mimpi Laila" Yasin Sulaiman in 2001 , "Wassini" sung by Waheeda in 2003 , and the song "Taat" sung by Rohana Jalil in 2005 are a mixture of Malay and Arabic songs. "Andalusia" and "Mimpi Laila" won the AJL Overall Champion while "Wassini" won the Malaysian Rhythm/Creative Ethnic Category Champion. Song "Men"

Performance by a substitute singer 

 The performance of the song is not necessarily sung by the original singer in the finals of the Juara Lagu. If the original singer can’t sing it, the songwriter has to find a replacement if he doesn’t want to withdraw. Interestingly, there were substitutes who managed to win any category and in 2012, Aizat Amdan who replaced Yuna Zarai through the song "Terukir Di Bintang" became the first substitute singer to win the AJL main award.

 Some of the songs that qualified for the AJL finals but were not sung by the original singer are:
 1986 - "Perjalananku" - Original singer Jamal Abdillah - Sung by Azman Abu Hassan
 1986 - "Cinta yang Terbiar" - Original singer Jamal Abdillah - Sung by Rohana Jalil (won)
 1987 - "Angan-angan" - Original singer Raja Ema - Sung by Skyfire Band
 1994 - "Bukan Aku Tak Cinta" - Original singer of Iklim Band - Sung by Adilla
 1995 - "Kau dan Aku" - Original singer Ning Baizura - Sung by Kool Band (won category)
 1995 - "Cinta Dangdut" - Original singer Ayati Tasrip - Sung by Masleena
 2006 - "Candak" - Original singer of Syura - Sung by Siti Nordiana
 2007 - "Izinku Pergi" - Singer from Kaer - Sung by Sahri (won)
 2007 - "Mahakarya Cinta" - Original singer Faizal Tahir - Sung by Fiq
 2007 - "Kasih Tercipta" - Original singer Faizal Tahir - Sung by Bob
 2011 - "Sedetik Lebih" - Original singer Anuar Zain - Sung by Jaclyn Victor
 2012 - "Terukir Di Bintang" - Original singer Yuna Zarai - Sung by Aizat Amdan (win)
 2014 - "Lelaki" - Original singer Yuna Zarai - Sung by Najwa Mahiaddin & The Palauans
 2017 - "Sejati" - Original singer Faizal Tahir - Sung by Azmi Caliph Buskers (won)
 2018 - "Bunga" - Original singer Altimet - Sung by De Fam
 2019 - "Anta Permana" - Original singer Siti Nurhaliza - Sung by Bob Yusof (won)
 2019 - "Ragaman" - Original singer Faizal Tahir - Sung by Fairuz Misran
 2020 - "Aku Bidadari Syurgamu" - Original singer Siti Nurhaliza - Sung by Aishah

 The duet song may be sung by the same singer for one of the duet couples, but when the Juara Lagu, one of the couples who sings it is an alternate singer:
 2006 - "Hantaran Hati" - Original singers Bob & Rosiah Chik - however due to the death of Rosiah Chik, her duet partner was replaced by Aspalela Abdullah.
 2007 - "Ceritera Cinta" - Original singer Jaclyn Victor & Rio Febrian - This song was originally sung by Jaclyn Victor with Indonesian singer Rio Febrian. However, Rio was not present to perform and was replaced by Lah Ahmad. The combination of Jaclyn and Lah won Best Vocal, making Lah the first replacement singer to win Best Vocal.
 2008 - "Doa Dalam Lagu" - Original singers Mawi & Heliza - Mawi was unable to join AJL for some reason.
 2012 - "Teman Pengganti" - Original singer Black Hanifah & Malique - This song saw the singer Black Hanafiah not perform with original rapper Malique Ibrahim who is also the composer, instead being replaced by new rapper, RJ. The combination of Black Hanafiah and RJ won Best Performance, making RJ the first replacement singer to win the category.
 2014 - "RomanCinta" - This song, the song of the Mojo Band was originally sung by its vocalist Aweera. However, Aweera has left the Mojo group and sheltered under another recording company causing Edry Abdul Halim to have to find a new vocalist to replace him. However, after a dispute arose with the original singer, Mojo chose to perform instead being represented by a group of street musicians with disability status (OKU), Caliph Buskers whom he met at Jalan Tuanku Abdul Rahman a few weeks before the competition. Caliph Buskers won Best Performance for the song.
 2016 - "Setia" - Original singers Elizabeth Tan & Faizal Tahir - Elizabeth Tan still competed in the Juara Lagu, but her duet partner was replaced by Awi Rafael.
 2020 - “7 Nasihat” - Original singers Kmy Kmo, Luca Sickta & Siti Nurhaliza - Kmy Kmo and Luca Sickta still compete in the Song Champion while Siti is replaced by Shiha Zikir .

 The song "Rayuanku" sung by Rohana Jalil was actually created especially for Zaiton Sameon . In fact, all the songs in the album Rayuanku were indeed created by A. Ali for Zaiton Sameon . Earlier, in the first edition of Juara Lagu, Rohana performed through the song "Cinta Yang Terbiar" representing singer Jamal Abdillah and won the third consolation place for Best Performance as well as becoming the first substitute singer to win any side prize at AJL.
 The song “Terukir Di Bintang” was the only song sung by the replacement singer to win the first place in AJL. The song was supposed to be sung by Yuna but due to the discrepancy of Yuna's recording schedule in the United States , Yuna has suggested that the song be handed over to Uji Rashid . However, at the last minute, TV3 decided to give the responsibility to Aizat . 
 Songs sung by singers who are different from the original singers in a group have also competed in Song Champions, for example Ekamatra who participated in 1990, through the song "Sentuhan Kecundang" and "Pusara Di Lebuhraya".

Intermission Performance 

 Aznil Nawawi with a group called "The Gambit" once brought back the memory of AJL in the 10th AJL intermission show by showing how he ruined the performance of the best AJL songs. Among them is from the show "Janji Manismu". Aznil snatched the bag from "Aishah" and took things out of the bag and the things were kitchen items like pans, stone mortars and grinders!

 There are six intermission performances that advance to next year's Juara Lagu:
 "Siti Payung" - Liza Aziz (1992): 1991 interlude (themed Malaysian Rhythm)
 "Dir" - Rahim Maarof (1993): interlude 1992 (in commemoration of the passing of the late Sudirman)
 "Gaia" - Zainal Abidin (2005): interlude 2004 (in conjunction with the theme of the Symphony of a Million Worlds)
 "Drama King" - Meet Uncle Hussein & Black (2010): 2009 interlude (in conjunction with representing the independent music revolution)
 "Bangun" - Aman RA (2019): 2018 interlude (in conjunction with representing the hip hop music revolution)
 "Eh" - Zizi Kirana (2020): opening 2019 (performed by another artist in conjunction with representing the creation of D. Navindran (composer))

 Aishah's performance always showed a difference every time she participated. The first time was the song “Janji Manismu” with the prop of a bag featuring Aishah wanting to go far. Secondly, for the song "Cinta Beralih Arah", Aishah danced with a " phantom " after her love was cheated on while "Kasihnya Balqis", Aishah brought her two sons while talking about Balqis before bedtime.

 Prior to 1990, all solo female artists who sang ballads sang the song solo without “ props ”. Aishah has led the show with props through the song "Janji Manismu" which she has used tables, lamps, pictures and large bags. Shima , on the other hand, became the first artist to be raised when performing through the song "Setelah Aku Kau Miliki" in 1991. After that, many singers have diversified their performances until now.

Others 

 Songs that were competed in AJL before 1992 were not categorized and even before 1992, the songs that were brought to AJL were the monthly champion songs. Songs that competed in the AJL after 2009 came back not categorized in a different way, namely including the semi -finals.

 Misha Omar is one of the new singers who was given the opportunity to perform on the red carpet during the 17th edition of AJL. Interestingly, during the 18th edition, Misha joined the next AJL (AJL 18 - 2003) to win that year.

 Not all artists who make two performances get the jury’s attention to be crowned Song Champions or category champions. Among the artists who risked two or more performances, but failed to win any Song Champion awards or category champions that year:
 1987 Song Champion - Alleycats Group - "Sekeping Hati Yang Luka" & "Hadirmu"
 1988 Song Champion - Kumpulan Gersang - "Suratan Takdir" & "Masih Aku Terasa"
 1989 Song Champion - Wings Group - "Taman Rashidah Utama" & "Misteri Mimpi Syakilla"
 1990 Song Champion - Ekamatra Group - "Pusara Di Lebuhraya" & "Sentuhan Kecundang"
 1994 Song Champion - Rohana Jalil - "Naluri Cinta" & "Jangan Main Mata"
 1997 Song Champion - Ziana Zain - "Kalau Mencari Teman" & "Senja Nan Merah"
 2000 Song Winner - Noraniza Idris - "Tinting" & "Ngajat Tampi"
 2001 Song Winner - Nora - "Menyemai Cinta Bersamamu" & "Desa Tercinta"
 2007 Song Champion - Faizal Tahir - "Kasih Tercipta" & "Mahakarya Cinta" ( not competing due to suspension )
 2010 Song Champion - Faizal Tahir - "Hanyut" & "Selamat Malam"
 2011 Song Champion - Yuna - "Current Girl" & "Coward"
 2017 Song Champion - Syamel - "Lebih Sempurna" & "Aku Cinta" (duet Ernie Zakri)
 Wings songs, Noraniza Idris and Faizal Tahir, still received awards in the Best Performance category. Wings won Best Performance through two songs that competed, while Noraniza Idris won it through the song Ngajat Tampi and Faizal Tahir won it through the song Hanyut.

Age of participation 
Youngest Artist

 ↑ Note 1  The Exists Group through their participation in 1992 consisted of 3 members under the age of 16 besides Mamat, namely G-Nola (14 years old) and Ajai (15 years old) as well as being the youngest group artist to join AJL.

The Oldest Singer

 ↑ Note 1  Rosiah Chik passed away a year before the finals of AJL21, and her participation as a finalist was posthumous. The age if he was still alive on the night of the show was 75 years 21 days. Rosiah was replaced by another veteran singer, Aspalela Abdullah

Composer

 G-Nola , Badiq Sheikh Hamzah & Najwa Latif are the youngest composers to join AJL at the age of 16 in the 1994 and 2011 editions respectively .

 Ika Latif, who is also Najwa Latif 's sister, became the youngest lyricist at the age of 19, through a song with Najwa Latif entitled "Cinta Muka Buku" in 2011 .

List of overall winners
The following are for each year of the competition, the winning song, the performer(s), composer and lyricist of the song:

References

Malaysian music awards
Malay-language music
Awards established in 1986
Television in Malaysia